Ursula Gläser is a retired slalom canoeist who competed for East Germany in the 1950s and 1960s. She won five medals at the ICF Canoe Slalom World Championships with four golds (K-1: 1965, K-1 team: 1965, Folding K-1 team: 1959, 1963) and a silver (Folding K-1: 1963).

References 
 Overview of athlete's results at canoeslalom.net
 

East German female canoeists
Possibly living people
Year of birth missing (living people)
Medalists at the ICF Canoe Slalom World Championships